Newton Horace Winchell (17 December 1839 – 2 May 1914) was an American geologist chiefly notable for his six-volume work The Geology of Minnesota: Final Report of the Geological and Natural History Survey of Minnesota, which was prepared by Winchell and his assistants. A bibliography of his publications by Warren Upham in the Bulletin of the Geological Society of America (volume 26, pp. 27–46) contains almost 300 titles.

Biography
Born in New York State, the younger brother of geologist Alexander Winchell, Newton Horace Winchell attended public school in Connecticut and then taught school in Connecticut and Michigan.  While teaching in Michigan he graduated from the University of Michigan and received a Master of Arts degree in 1867. He then did geological studies in Michigan, Ohio, and New Mexico.

Winchell settled in Minnesota in 1872 when he was appointed to direct the Geological and Natural History Survey of Minnesota. At the same time, he taught courses in geology, botany, and zoology at the University of Minnesota. He had a reputation for "great diligence and honesty" (Merrill, 1964) and was considered "an honest, very competent geologist" (Thrapp, 1990).

When he accompanied the Custer expedition to the Black Hills of South Dakota in 1874, Winchell prepared the first geological map of that area. He was also one of the founders of the Geological Society of America, a chief organizer of the Minnesota Academy of Sciences, and the president of several societies, including The Geological Society of America in 1902.

The Minnesota Historical Society, led by Winchell as Minnesota State Geologist, investigated the Kensington Runestone in 1909–1910. They were most interested in the physical aspects of the stone and the location of the find. Winchell made three trips to Kensington, examining the discovery site and the similar glacier-carried boulders in the area, and interviewing Olaf Öhman (the finder of the stone), his neighbors, and the townspeople. Winchell recorded his observations, sketch maps, and interviews in a pocket field notebook.  He wrote in his notebook: "I had a long talk with Mr. Ohman, and am impressed with the evident candor and truthfulness of all his statements". Winchell's geological examination of the Kensington Runestone has been adduced to suggest that the stone is authentic, though most scholars now believe it is a forgery.

Winchell married Charlotte Sophia Imus and had six children: Horace Vaughn (who also became a geologist), Ima Caroline, Avis (Mrs. Ulysses Sherman Grant), Alexander Newton, and Louise.

Winchell Trail in southeast Minneapolis is named after Winchell. The trail runs about 2.5 miles along the west bank of the Mississippi River from Franklin Avenue South to East 44th Street. His namesake is also attributed to Winchell Lake, located in the Boundary Waters Canoe Area Wilderness, within Cook County in Northeastern Minnesota.

References

Sources

 The Kensington Rune Stone: Compelling New Evidence at www.KensingtonRunestone.com

External links
 Newton Horace Winchell: a Tribute
 
 Newton Horace Winchell papers, University Archives, University of Minnesota - Twin Cities

1839 births
1914 deaths
American geologists
University of Michigan alumni
Presidents of the Geological Society of America